Wayland Square is a historic area on the East Side of Providence, Rhode Island near Brown University and the Rhode Island School of Design.

History

The square and Wayland Avenue are named after Francis Wayland, a Baptist pastor and president of Brown University. Most of the area was developed in the early twentieth century with many Queen Anne style apartment buildings. The area remained largely undeveloped until the twentieth century because of the marshy environment adjacent to the river. Today, the square features numerous businesses, houses of worship, and restaurants. It is also home to the Red Bridge, which crosses the Seekonk River.

See also
Lincoln School (Providence, Rhode Island)
Saint Martin's Church, Providence
Temple Beth-El (Providence, Rhode Island)
Wayland Historic District

References

External links
Go Providence: Wayland Square

Squares in Providence, Rhode Island